Bawsey is a  geological Site of Special Scientific Interest east of Kings' Lynn in Norfolk. It is a Geological Conservation Review site.

This site has Quaternary till, unsorted glacial sediments, with a depth of up to five metres. It is separated from the main East Anglian till sheet, and it is the type site for the Bawsey Calcareous Till.

The site is private land with no public access.

References

External links

Sites of Special Scientific Interest in Norfolk
Geological Conservation Review sites